The immunoglobulin superfamily (IgSF) is a large protein superfamily of cell surface and soluble proteins that are involved in the recognition, binding, or adhesion processes of cells. Molecules are categorized as members of this superfamily based on shared structural features with immunoglobulins (also known as antibodies); they all possess a domain known as an immunoglobulin domain or fold. Members of the IgSF include cell surface antigen receptors, co-receptors and co-stimulatory molecules of the immune system, molecules involved in antigen presentation to lymphocytes, cell adhesion molecules, certain cytokine receptors and intracellular muscle proteins. They are commonly associated with roles in the immune system. Otherwise, the sperm-specific protein IZUMO1, a member of the immunoglobulin superfamily, has also been identified as the only sperm membrane protein essential for sperm-egg fusion.

Immunoglobulin domains

Proteins of the IgSF possess a structural domain known as an immunoglobulin (Ig) domain. Ig domains are named after the immunoglobulin molecules. They contain about 70-110 amino acids and are categorized according to their size and function.  Ig-domains possess a characteristic Ig-fold, which has a sandwich-like structure formed by two sheets of antiparallel beta strands. Interactions between hydrophobic amino acids on the inner side of the sandwich and highly conserved disulfide bonds formed between cysteine residues in the B and F strands, stabilize the Ig-fold.

Classification
The Ig like domains can be classified as IgV, IgC1, IgC2, or IgI.

Most Ig domains are either variable (IgV) or constant (IgC).
 IgV: IgV domains with 9 beta strands are generally longer than IgC domains with 7 beta strands.
 IgC1 and IgC2: Ig domains of some members of the IgSF resemble IgV domains in the amino acid sequence, yet are similar in size to IgC domains. These are called IgC2 domains, while standard IgC domains are called IgC1 domains.
 IgI: Other Ig domains exist that are called intermediate (I) domains.

Members

The Ig domain was reported to be the most populous family of proteins in the human genome with 765 members identified. Members of the family can be found even in the bodies of animals with a simple physiological structure such as poriferan sponges. They have also been found in bacteria, where their presence is likely to be due to divergence from a shared ancestor of eukaryotic immunoglobulin superfamily domains.

References

External links 
 Transmembrane human proteins from immunoglobulin superfamily classified as receptors, ligands and adhesion proteins 
 Immunoglobulin domain in SUPERFAMILY

 
Receptors
Immunology
Protein superfamilies